Cameron Proceviat (born 20 September 1993) is a Canadian middle-distance runner.

Proceviat was selected to compete for Canada at the 2022 World Athletics Championships in Oregon in the 1500m event. Proceviat is also the Canadian record holder in the indoor mile event, recording a 3:52.54 in 2022. He holds a 1500m personal best of 3:36.09, set in 2022.

Proceviat also serves as a part time coach with Simon Fraser University.

References

External links 
 

1993 births
Living people
Canadian male middle-distance runners
21st-century Canadian people